Amanita chrysoblema, with the common name American fly agaric, white variant, is a basidiomycete fungus of the genus Amanita. Although named chrysoblema, it is traditionally thought to be an Amanita muscaria variant, a group of fungi commonly known as fly agarics.

A. chrysoblema is an uncommon fungus, distinguishable by an off-white to silvery-white cap with white warts. The cap has cuts on the side, but is otherwise similar to the usual fly agaric form.

The fungi is poisonous due to high levels of ibotenic acid and muscimol.

Taxonomy 
This white fly agaric was first described by science in 1880 by Peck, who classified it as an Amanita muscaria variant as A. muscaria var. alba. In 1918, Kauffmann named it Amanita chrysoblema during a study from Michigan, but the var. alba (or var. albus) name has been used in parallel to this since then. 

It is possible that this Amanita is not a muscaria, or fly agaric, but a species in its own right. This issue is currently under scientific scrutiny. The muscaria classification, may stem from it being wrongly treated as a white variant of the Amanita muscaria var. flavivolvata.

References

chrysoblema
Poisonous fungi